is a passenger railway station located in the town of Kamikawa, Kanzaki District, Hyōgo Prefecture, Japan, operated by West Japan Railway Company (JR West).

Lines

Station layout
The station consists of one side platform and one island platform connected to the station building by a footbridge. The station has a Midori no Madoguchi staffed ticket office. The platforms are used without differentiation in train operating direction. The limited express Hamakaze departs from platform 1.

Platforms

Adjacent stations

|-
!colspan=5|West Japan Railway Company

History
Teramae Station opened on July 26, 1894.  With the privatization of the Japan National Railways (JNR) on April 1, 1987, the station came under the aegis of the West Japan Railway Company.

Passenger statistics
In fiscal 2016, the station was used by an average of 413 passengers daily.

Surrounding area
 Kamikawa Town Tourist Association (adjacent to the station building) 
 Kamikawa Town Hall 
Kamikawa Municipal Teramae Elementary School
 Kamikawa Municipal Okochi Junior High School

See also
List of railway stations in Japan

References

External links

  

Railway stations in Hyōgo Prefecture
Bantan Line
Railway stations in Japan opened in 1894
Kamikawa, Hyōgo